Sarclet is a remote clifftop crofting township, situated on the east coast of Caithness, lying slightly north of Loch Sarclet in the Scottish Highlands and is in the Scottish council area of Highland.

Sarclet Head extends into the sea and is 0.5 miles to the southeast of the township. Sarclet has a natural harbour called The Haven which was formerly used by fishing boats, but is now largely unused.

The village of Thrumster lies 0.5 miles north west, with Wick located 5 north of the township.

Decoy Site
Sarclet was a location for a Q/QF large-scale night-time decoy airfield during World War II, that were used to simulate burning cities. The site was used to provide some protection for Wick.

References

Populated places in Caithness